The Tiffany Cross Medal of Honor arose immediately after World War I, as the US Navy decided to recognize via the Medal of Honor two  manners of heroism, one in combat and one in the line of a sailor's profession.  The original upside-down star was designated as the non-combat version and a new pattern of the medal pendant, in cross form, was designed by the Tiffany Company in 1919.  It was to be presented to a sailor or Marine who "in action involving actual conflict with the enemy, distinguish[es] himself conspicuously by gallantry and intrepidity at the risk of his life above and beyond the call of duty and without detriment to his mission." This pendant became the Tiffany Cross.

Description
The Tiffany Cross is suspended from the light blue Medal of Honor ribbon with 13 white stars. At the ribbon top is a bar with the word "VALOUR".  The medal is a gold cross pattée overlaying an oak and laurel wreath on the obverse side, with an antique anchor in each arm of the cross.  The center, overlaying the cross, is an octagon with the phrases "UNITED STATES NAVY" to the top and "1917·1918" to the bottom, on the perimeter separated by two stars.  The center of the octagon is the Great Seal of the United States.  The reverse side is flat, suitable for engraving.  Awardees' medals often had intricate inscriptions.

Authorization
On 4 February 1919, in the same act that created the Navy Cross and the Navy Distinguished Service Medal, Congress provided:

Designed by Tiffany Company, this medal became the Tiffany Cross and eligibility was retroactive to 6 April 1917, when the United States entered World War I.

Inconsistent presentations
Despite the "actual conflict" guidelines, the Tiffany Cross was awarded to Floyd Bennett and Richard Byrd for arctic exploration, and to John Siegel for a rescue at sea. In the words of the Congressional Medal of Honor Society, the Tiffany Cross Program was "poorly regulated and documented."

Unpopularity and deauthorization
The Tiffany Cross was unpopular, perhaps because it so closely resembled the German Iron Cross. Recipients, such as Richard E. Byrd, requested, received, and wore the classical inverted star design.  Byrd received his Tiffany Cross on 27 February 1927 from President Coolidge.  He received his classical Medal of Honor on 20 June 1930 from President Hoover.  His motives for the change are not recorded.  In 1942, the Navy returned to using only the original 1862 inverted 5-point star design, and ceased issuing the award for non-combat action.

Next lower award
During the Tiffany Cross's active status, the next lower naval award was the Navy Distinguished Service Medal, followed by the Navy Cross. By congressional action on 7 August 1942, in the same act that terminated the Tiffany Cross, the Distinguished Service Medal and the Navy Cross swapped places, with the Navy Cross also becoming solely a combat award.

Recipients
The US Naval History & Heritage Command asserts that 28 sailors and Marines received the Tiffany Cross, but does not provide a list.  The Navy's assertion of 28 recipients is believed to be derived from the fact that 21 Sailors and 7 Marines were awarded the Medal of Honor for actions during World War I.  However, a review of:
 presentation photographs to Medal of Honor recipients,
 photographs or paintings of recipients wearing a Tiffany Cross,
 photographs of engravings on the medal's reverse side (many on the Naval History website),
 museum displays of recipient medals,
 recipient headstone markers,
 newspaper accounts of the presentation ceremony and
 application of the "actual conflict" criterion
make a nearly complete list of 22 recipients. Based on analysis of all recipients of the Navy version of the Medal of Honor from 1919 to 1942, these 22 recipients are believed to be the only individuals that received the Tiffany Cross version of the Medal of Honor. There are at least three recipients (Byrd, Bennett, Siegal) who were awarded the Tiffany Cross for non-combat actions. There may be other in-period recipients, but these are not known and would require similar investigation.

List

See also
 List of Medal of Honor recipients for World War I
 List of Medal of Honor recipients during peacetime
 List of Medal of Honor recipients during the Occupation of Nicaragua

Notes

References

Medal of Honor
Awards and decorations of the United States Navy
Awards and decorations of the United States Marine Corps
Awards established in 1919
Tiffany & Co.